Turtle Soup is the fifth and final studio album by the American rock band the Turtles. It was released in 1969 on the White Whale Records label. The album was produced by Ray Davies of the Kinks – the first time he produced another artist's record. A 1993 Repertoire Records CD-issue included 8 bonus tracks. A 1996 Sundazed Records reissue included two bonus tracks.

Turtle Soup peaked at #117 on the Billboard Pop Albums chart. Two singles from the album also earned a place on the Billboard Pop Singles chart: "You Don't Have to Walk in the Rain" (#51), and "Love in the City" (#91).

Recording and release 

Ray Davies of the English rock band the Kinks produced the sessions with engineer Chuck Britz. Ray Pohlman, the musical director of the musical variety series Shindig!, provided string and horn arrangements.

Of the six songs recorded in April, "House on the Hill" was considered for release as a single, but the label withdrew its release after making promotional copies. "You Don't Have to Walk in the Rain" backed with "Come Over" was instead issued by White Whale Records in the US in May and by London Records in the UK on June 3.

Track listing

All tracks written by Howard Kaylan, Mark Volman, Al Nichol, Jim Pons and John Seiter, except as indicated.

Side A 
"Come Over" – 2:18
"House on the Hill" – 2:58
"She Always Leaves Me Laughing" – 2:46
"How You Love Me" – 2:56
"Torn Between Temptations" – 2:45
"Love in the City" – 3:37

Side B 
"Bachelor Mother" – 2:38
"John and Julie" – 3:10
"Hot Little Hands" – 4:10
"Somewhere Friday Night" – 3:20
"Dance This Dance" – 3:30
"You Don't Have to Walk in the Rain" – 2:42

Repertoire Bonus tracks
"Chicken Little Was Right" (Single version) – 2:53
"Lady-O" (Judee Sill)– 2:53
"The Last Thing I Remember" – 3:25
"The Owl" – 4:26
"To See the Sun" – 4:12
"If We Only Had the Time" – 5:09
"Can I Go On" – 3:00
"Dance This Dance" – 3:17

Sundazed Bonus tracks
"Lady-O" (Sill) - 2:54
 "The Last Thing I Remember" (1986 Chalon Road LP Version) (hidden track with 1969 radio commercial starts at 3:30)- 4:28

Manifesto Bonus tracks
"Goodbye Surprise" (Alan Gordon, Gary Bonner) - 2:55
 "Like It or Not" (Gordon, Bonner)- 3:41
 "There You Sit Lonely" (Kaylan, Volman) - 3:42
 "Can I Go On" - 2:59
 "You Want to Be a Woman" - 3:25
 "If We Only Had the Time" - 5:11
 "Dance This Dance With Me" (demo) - 3:17
 "Come Over" (demo) - 2:22
 "How You Love Me" (demo) - 3:39
 "Strange Girl" (demo) - 2:45
 "Marmendy Mill" (demo) - 3:13
 "Turtle Soup Radio Spot" - 0:55

References

Sources 

 

The Turtles albums
1969 albums
White Whale Records albums
Albums produced by Ray Davies